The George Bradshaw House and Joshua Salisbury/George Bradshaw Barn in Wellsville, Utah, was listed on the National Register of Historic Places in 1982.  The George Bradshaw House is significant as a rare example of Second Empire architecture in any rural area of Utah. The listing also includes a historic stone barn on the property, dating to approximately 1875.

References

Houses on the National Register of Historic Places in Utah
Second Empire architecture in Utah
Houses completed in 1903
Houses in Cache County, Utah
Barns on the National Register of Historic Places in Utah
Barns in Utah
National Register of Historic Places in Cache County, Utah